Robert Bice (March 14, 1914 – January 8, 1968), was an American television and film actor.

Biography
He was born on March 14, 1914, in Dallas, Texas. He died on January 8, 1968, in Los Angeles, California.

Career
Bice appeared in 199 films and television programs between 1943 and 1967. His first film was the comedy/horror The Ghost and the Guest (1943) and his career ended with four episodes in the popular western TV series Death Valley Days. Between 1957 and 1964 Bice made seven appearances on Perry Mason as Frank Faulkner, operative for Mason's private detective Paul Drake.

His television credits include The Lone Ranger (1950),  The Cisco Kid (1951), The Public Defender (1954), Have Gun - Will Travel (1957), I Love Lucy (1957), M Squad (1957), Fury (1959), Peter Gunn (1960), Bat Masterson (1961), The Life and Legend of Wyatt Earp (1961), Rawhide (1961–62), The Rifleman (1959–62), The Untouchables (1961–62), Wagon Train (1959–62), Surfside 6 (1962) and Daniel Boone (1964–1970) and Gunsmoke, among many more.

Bice's film credits include:

 The Ghost and the Guest (1943) - Smoothie Lewis
 Appointment in Berlin (1943) - Radio Man (uncredited)
 Fighting Valley (1943) - Paul Jackson
 The Iron Major (1943) - High School Coach (uncredited)
 Gildersleeve on Broadway (1943) - Eddie, the Bellhop (uncredited)
 Gangway for Tomorrow (1943) - Stooge (uncredited)
 The Ghost Ship (1943) - Raphael - the Steward (uncredited)
 Passport to Destiny (1944) - German Troop Leader (uncredited)
 Dragon Seed (1944) - Lao Ta Tan - Eldest Son
 Thirty Seconds Over Tokyo (1944) - 'Jig' White
 G.I. War Brides (1946) - Bill Sears (uncredited)
 The Mysterious Mr. Valentine (1946) - Doctor
 The Beginning or the End (1947) - Co-Pilot (uncredited)
 The Sea of Grass (1947) - Brewton Ranch Hand (uncredited)
 The Bachelor and the Bobby-Soxer (1947) - Policeman at Airport (uncredited)
 The Red Stallion (1947) - Ho-Na
 Assigned to Danger (1948) - Frankie Mantell
 Raw Deal (1948) - Ship's Crewman (uncredited)
 Canon City (1948) - Morgan
 Hollow Triumph (1948) - Maxwell's Thug (uncredited)
 In This Corner (1948) - Cmdr. Harris
 Joan of Arc (1948) - Dying English Archer (uncredited)
 He Walked by Night (1948) - Detective with Capt. Breen (uncredited)
 Let's Live a Little (1948) - Elevator Operator (uncredited)
 Bride of Vengeance (1949) - Guard (uncredited)
 Susanna Pass (1949) - Bob Oliver
 Illegal Entry (1949) - Ken (uncredited)
 Too Late for Tears (1949) - Policeman (uncredited)
 Flaming Fury (1949) - Arthur Latch - Lab Technician (uncredited)
 Bandit King of Texas (1949) - Henchman Gus
 The James Brothers of Missouri (1949) - Frank James
 Thieves' Highway (1949) - Announcer (uncredited)
 Johnny Holiday (1949) - Policeman (uncredited)
 Life of St. Paul Series (1949) - Roman Soldier
 Bells of Coronado (1950) - Jim Russell
 Bunco Squad (1950) - Drake - aka The Swami
 Between Midnight and Dawn (1950) - Detective (uncredited)
 Hit Parade of 1951 (1950) - Cowboy (uncredited)
 The Jackpot (1950) - Policeman in Bookie Raid (uncredited)
 Under Mexicali Stars (1950) - Deputy Bob
 Counterspy Meets Scotland Yard (1950) - Agent Fields
 The Flying Missile (1950) - Airbase Military Police Officer (uncredited)
 Al Jennings of Oklahoma (1951) - Pete Kincaid
 Cry Danger (1951) - Castro's Gunman (uncredited)
 The Living Christ Series (1951, TV Series) - Matthew
 Tales of Robin Hood (1951) - Will Scarlet
 Gunplay (1951) - Sam Martin
 A Millionaire for Christy (1951) - Reporter with Tape Recorder (uncredited)
 The Well (1951) - Manager of Packard Construction Company (uncredited)
 The Racket (1951) - Police Dispatcher (uncredited)
 The Big Night (1951) - Taxi Driver (uncredited)
 Night Stage to Galveston (1952) - Captain Yancey
 Red Snow (1952) - Chief Nanu
 Loan Shark (1952) - Steve Casmer (uncredited)
 Desert Pursuit (1952) - Tomaso (uncredited)
 Cripple Creek (1952) - James Sullivan - Assayer (uncredited)
 Junction City (1952) - Bleaker
 Captain Pirate (1952) - Lieutenant (uncredited)
 Captive Women (1952) - Bram
 Horizons West (1952) - Townsman (uncredited)
 Invasion U.S.A. (1952) - George Sylvester
 Hiawatha (1952) - Wabeek
 Star of Texas (1953) - Henchman Al Slade
 The Blue Gardenia (1953) - Policeman (uncredited)
 On Top of Old Smoky (1953) - Kirby (uncredited)
 Port Sinister (1953) - George Burt
 The Marksman (1953) - Kincaid - Henchman
 The 49th Man (1953) - Detective (uncredited)
 Tarzan and the She-Devil (1953) - Maka, Vargo's Safari Boss (uncredited)
 Gun Belt (1953) - Wells Fargo Guard (uncredited)
 Bandits of the West (1953) - Henchman Dutch
 The Moonlighter (1953) - Bar X Man in Lynch Mob (uncredited)
 Paris Model (1953) - Jack Parmalee
 Man Crazy (1953) - Narrator (uncredited)
 The Wild One (1953) - Wilson (uncredited)
 Trader Tom of the China Seas (1954, Serial) - Payne (uncredited)
 The Golden Idol (1954) - Gate Guard (uncredited)
 Riot in Cell Block 11 (1954) - Cell Block Guard (uncredited)
 Yankee Pasha (1954) - Sentry (uncredited)
 Johnny Dark (1954) - Guard (uncredited)
 The Far Country (1954) - Miner (uncredited)
 The Adventures of Hajji Baba (1954) - Musa (uncredited)
 The Snow Creature (1954) - Fleet
 Sign of the Pagan (1954) - Chilothe
 The Violent Men (1954) - Tony (uncredited)
 Day of Triumph (1954) - Zealot (uncredited)
 The Steel Cage (1954) - Convict in Mess Hall (segment "The Chef")
 Bowery to Bagdad (1955) - Duke Dolan
 Many Rivers to Cross (1955) - Punishment Party Member (uncredited)
 Three for the Show (1955) - Sgt. Charlie O'Hallihan (uncredited)
 Dial Red O (1955) - Sgt. Tony Columbo
 The Big Bluff (1955) - Dr. Harrison
 Foxfire (1955) - Walt Whitman
 The Gun That Won the West (1955) - Chief Red Cloud
 Trial (1955) - Abbott (uncredited)
 Teen-Age Crime Wave (1955) - Highway Patrol Officer Smith (uncredited)
 The Court-Martial of Billy Mitchell (1955) - Naval Officer Aide (uncredited)
 Over-Exposed (1956) - Patrolman Outside Office Building (uncredited)
 Calling Homicide (1956) - Det. Johnny Phipps (uncredited)
 The Ten Commandments (1956) - Sergeant (uncredited)
 The White Squaw (1956) - Cowhand (uncredited)
 Dance with Me, Henry (1956) - Policeman (uncredited)
 Hold That Hypnotist (1957) - Reporter (uncredited)
 The Helen Morgan Story (1957) - Guard (uncredited)
 Jailhouse Rock (1957) - Bardeman - TV Studio Manager (uncredited)
 Diamond Safari (1958) - Reubens
 Going Steady (1958) - Coach (uncredited)
 Space Master X-7 (1958) - Officer (uncredited)
 The Case Against Brooklyn (1958) - Policeman (uncredited)
 It! The Terror from Beyond Space (1958) - Maj. John Purdue
 The Buccaneer (1958) - Militia Man (uncredited)
 Revolt in the Big House (1958) - Guard (uncredited)
 Good Day for a Hanging (1959) - Griswald (uncredited)
 Ocean's 11 (1960) - Deputy (scenes deleted)
 Ada (1961) - Member of the State Legislature (uncredited)

References

External links
 
 
 

Male actors from Texas
American male film actors
American male television actors
1914 births
1968 deaths
20th-century American male actors